First published in 1992, Parliamentary Brief is a monthly British political magazine circulated by request to members of the British House of Commons, members of the House of Lords, senior civil servants, and political journalists.  Reports—some produced in association with international institutions, including the United Nations—are distributed to a wider  audience. This includes, for example, the European Union, public sector bodies, and corporate organisations. It is based in London.

Dubbed by one political commentator as the ‘magazine for the political in-crowd’ its editorial columns are noted for their expert analysis. Many of the topics it covers do not make headlines in the mainstream press, but nevertheless are critical to analysis of government policy at home and abroad. It has been described as ‘required reading’ (George Jones, political editor, The Daily Telegraph), with ‘an impressive range of sources’ (Philip Gould, adviser to the Prime Minister, 10 Downing Street). It is no longer in print. 

Wholly independent, Parliamentary Brief has no association or links with any political party though as part of its coverage of current affairs it publishes articles by senior figures from across the political divide.

Although ‘non-party’ its commentary is often severely critical. It has pursued campaigns with some distinction  — for example, in highlighting genocide in Darfur long before that issue was taken up by the general media and in warning of the shortfalls in the UK government’s response to climate change.

References

External links
Official website 

1992 establishments in the United Kingdom
Magazines established in 1992
Magazines published in London
Monthly magazines published in the United Kingdom
Political magazines published in the United Kingdom